Maryland House of Delegates District 40 is one of 47 legislative districts in the state of Maryland and one of the 5 located entirely within Baltimore City. The 40th district is located in the central western portions of Baltimore City and contains the Druid Park Lake, Druid Hill Park and The Maryland Zoo.

Voters in this district select three Delegates every four years to represent them in the Maryland House of Delegates.

Demographic characteristics
As of the 2020 United States census, the district had a population of 102,052, of whom 83,408 (81.7%) were of voting age. The racial makeup of the district was 24,344 (23.9%) White, 65,470 (64.2%) African American, 309 (0.3%) Native American, 4,258 (4.2%) Asian, 20 (0.0%) Pacific Islander, 2,363 (2.3%) from some other race, and 5,263 (5.2%) from two or more races. Hispanic or Latino of any race were 4,688 (4.6%) of the population.

The district had 71,059 registered voters as of October 17, 2020, of whom 9,266 (13.0%) were registered as unaffiliated, 4,357 (6.1%) were registered as Republicans, 56,387 (79.4%) were registered as Democrats, and 617 (0.9%) were registered to other parties.

Educational institutions
Coppin State University, Baltimore City Community College, University of Maryland School of Law, and the University of Maryland, Baltimore are all located in the 40th district.

High schools
The 40th district is also home to two of Baltimore's oldest African-American high schools: Douglass High School (1883) and Carver Vocational Technical High School (1925).

Political representation
The district is represented for the 2023–2027 legislative term in the State Senate by Antonio L. Hayes (D) and in the House of Delegates by Marlon D. Amprey (D), Frank M. Conaway Jr. (D) and Melissa R. Wells (D).

Election history
During the four years prior to the 2006 elections, two of the delegates, Howard "Pete" Rawlings and Tony Fulton, died while in office.  Marshall Goodwin and Catherine E. Pugh were appointed to finish their terms.  Rawlings and Fulton were democrats, as are Goodwin and Pugh.  Prior to the 2006 democratic primary, the only incumbent delegate in the district, Salima Marriott, decided to run for the Senate seat being vacated by the district's senator.  Catherine Pugh also decided to run for the same seat leaving the newly appointed Goodwin as the only incumbent in the race.  The vacancies drew a large crowd of contenders;  including Conaway, Barbara Robinson and Shawn Tarrant, who all finished ahead of Goodwin.  The General Election in November, therefore, featured all newcomers for the three open seats.

General election results, 2006

References

Baltimore
40
40